Bula is an unincorporated community in Bailey County, Texas, United States. According to the Handbook of Texas, the community had a population of 35 in 2000.

History
The community of Bula was established in 1924 and was originally given the name Newsome for W.B. Newsome. He and his brother, Tom, sold their ranch and divided it into  of farms in 1924-25. Due to a conflict with another Texas post office with the same name, the name was changed to Bula in 1925. It was given this name in honor of either Bula Maude Oakes, who was a daughter of Methodist preacher Roma A. Oakes, or Bula Thorn, who was the wife of the community's first postmaster, William H. Thorn. Bula had a cotton gin in 1929 but never grew significantly. By 1980, the population had risen to only 105, then dropped to 35 in 2000.

Although it is unincorporated, Bula has a post office, with the ZIP code of 79324.

Geography
It is located on Farm to Market Roads 54 and 37,  to the west of Littlefield, the county seat of Lamb County.

Education
Bula had a school in 1925, which later moved and then closed in 1975. The school then burned sometime after. Today, the community is served by the Sudan Independent School District.

See also
Eastern New Mexico
Llano Estacado
Needmore
Pep
Texas Panhandle
West Texas

References

External links

Public domain photos of the Llano Estacado

Unincorporated communities in Bailey County, Texas
Unincorporated communities in Texas